In enzymology, a tetrahydromethanopterin S-methyltransferase is an enzyme that catalyzes the chemical reaction

5-methyl-5,6,7,8-tetrahydromethanopterin + 2-mercaptoethanesulfonate  5,6,7,8-tetrahydromethanopterin + 2-(methylthio)ethanesulfonate

Thus, the two substrates of this enzyme are 5-methyl-5,6,7,8-tetrahydromethanopterin and 2-mercaptoethanesulfonate (coenzyme M), whereas its two products are 5,6,7,8-tetrahydromethanopterin and 2-(methylthio)ethanesulfonate.

This enzyme belongs to the family of transferases, specifically those transferring one-carbon group methyltransferases.  The systematic name of this enzyme class is 5-methyl-5,6,7,8-tetrahydromethanopterin:2-mercaptoethanesulfonate 2-methyltransferase. This enzyme is also called tetrahydromethanopterin methyltransferase.  This enzyme participates in folate biosynthesis.

References 

 

EC 2.1.1
Enzymes of unknown structure